Third Way is a Washington, D.C.–based public policy think tank founded in 2005. Third Way develops and advocates for policies that it claims represent "modern center-left ideas".

Third Way was honoured as the 2013 North American Think Tank of the Year by Prospect, a British monthly current affairs magazine, for its "original, influential, and rigorous work on the most pressing challenges facing people, governments, and businesses". The think tank's supporters and advocates include Democratic politicians, other center-left think tanks, and individual donors. Third Way's funding also partially comes from philanthropy, foundations and personal donations. In the past decade, Third Way has been directly involved in policy issues such as the benefits of energy innovation, student accountability measures under the Every Student Succeeds Act, deficit reduction, proposals to reform Medicare and Medicaid, the repeal of "Don't ask, don't tell", and new trade accords with Colombia, South Korea, and Panama.

History 
Third Way grew out of the nonprofit group Americans for Gun Safety (AGS), which was formed in 2000 with the objective of resetting the gun control movement and advancing gun safety laws, using moderate ideas that appealed to both sides of the debate. AGS' primary political project was  closing the gun show loophole, through which people could purchase guns at gun shows without needing a background check, by passing the Brady Handgun Violence Prevention Act. It helped pass two 2000 state-level ballot initiatives in Colorado and Oregon to close the gun show loophole there and attempted to pass federal legislation carried by Senators John McCain (R-AZ) and Joe Lieberman (D-CT), which failed to become law. AGS was folded into Third Way in 2005 in the wake of the 2004 presidential election as a policy, messaging, and strategy idea center and think tank. Third Way was co-founded by Jonathan Cowan, Matt Bennett, Jim Kessler, and Nancy Hale.

Policy areas 
Third Way's work covers seven policy areas: climate and energy, economy, education, healthcare, national security, politics, and social policy. In the climate area, Third Way advocates for nuclear energy and other clean energy alternatives.  In economic policy, Third Way advocates for infrastructure development and tax reform. In education, Third Way focuses on addressing what they see as issues in both K-12 and higher education. Protecting and improving the Affordable Care Act is Third Way's aim regarding healthcare. Third Way also seeks to develop electoral strategies for the broader left and advocates for socially liberal policies such as abortion rights, same-sex marriage, and the legalisation of Marijuana.

Policy work 
In 2010, Third Way sponsored a report written by William Galston of the Brookings Institution and Elaine Kamarck of Harvard Kennedy School titled "Change You Can Believe In Needs a Government You Can Trust". The report analysed Americans' trust in government and reported it was in serious decline, possibly presenting significant challenges to the Obama administration's agenda. Third Way's other economic work has included rural reinvestment efforts, a plan to make opportunity more widely available to American middle class and defending the Patient Protection and Affordable Care Act.

As an example of Third Way's rural reinvestment program, Third Way developed the policies framed in Spurring Weatherization Investments in Rural America, which was introduced by Representative Jim Clyburn (D-South Carolina) and Senator Lindsey Graham (R-South Carolina) as the Rural Energy Savings Program. Third Way argued for members of opposing parties to sit together at the President's annual address in 2011 and 2012.

Third Way has recently worked on a campaign to evaluate the Democratic Party connection with voters after the 2016 presidential election. Along those lines, Third Way hosted consultations and meetings with politicians and strategists from around the country to develop a Democratic strategy for winning 2018 and 2020 elections. As of 2017, Third Way's economic program is undertaking a campaign to highlight the scarcity of opportunity as a root cause of income inequality.

In March 2018, Third Way released a report outlining a new cause for the Democratic Party and several policy ideas that the organisation says "redefines government's role in expanding the opportunity to earn". The Washington Posts coverage of the report considered it "an opening bid in the 2020 'ideas primary'". Other parts of Third Way's work are also related to politics, including their study of the battleground states and districts that determined congressional majorities in 2018.

In addition, their public opinion research and focus groups revealed that persuadable voters who backed Barack Obama and then Donald Trump saw Trump as focused on creating jobs and Democrats as "working for someone else". In its report on the findings, Third Way called for the Democratic Party to focus on becoming the Jobs Party to voters.

Specific topics 
Third Way has worked on the following policy issues:
 The economic benefits of green energy. Since 2010, Third Way has lobbied for the creation of an alternative clean energy and climate agenda. Part of this effort has included highlighting and advocating the work of advanced nuclear technology start-ups. In 2017, the organization partnered with the Department of Energy's Gateway for Accelerated Innovation in Nuclear (GAIN) to connect advanced nuclear developers with federal laboratories.
 Marriage equality. Third Way launched the Commitment Campaign in 2011 with the aim of finding common ground between the LGBT and organized religion that culminated in reframing the marriage equality debate to focus on "love and commitment" instead of "rights and benefits". The group also worked on the repeal of "Don't ask, don't tell" and the Defense of Marriage Act.
 Trade agreements. Third Way advocated for new trade accords with Colombia, South Korea, and Panama, and advocated for the Trans-Pacific Partnership.
 Gun safety. Third Way has continued to work on similar issues to those addressed by Americans for Gun Safety, which include universal background checks.

Criticism

Special interests 
The majority of the think tank's funding comes from individuals with close ties to the banking industry and its board of trustees consists mostly of investment bankers. Political commentator and Bernie Sanders campaign official David Sirota suggested that the think tank's initiatives to combat Social Security expansion despite popular sentiment is because it would cause trustees of the think tank to pay higher taxes. Hunter of Daily Kos has suggested Third Way's ties to the banking industry is the reason for its opposition to Senator Elizabeth Warren's platform of Wall Street reform. Investigative journalist Lee Fang of The Nation alleges the think tank's ties to the Democratic Party are "tenuous" and that it exists to serve as a vehicle for corporate and right-wing interests to shape the economic policies of the party. Writing in The Intercept, Akela Lacy describes Third Way as a "center-left, corporate and GOP donor-funded nonprofit" which advocates for neoliberal policies and is staunchly opposed to Medicare For All.

Allegations of invalid research 
In 2017, the Third Way think tank conducted a listening tour in rural Wisconsin as part of its research to understand the results of the 2016 presidential election. This tour was the focus of an article in The Atlantic magazine, where reporter Molly Ball observed many focus group participants expressing strongly politically partisan views that challenged Third Way's ideology that political partisanship was not most people's primary concern. Ball recounts hearing focus group participants blame things like government bureaucracy, changes in society and the family, young people, welfare recipients, Muslims, Republicans, Democrats, income inequality, gerrymandering and union rights for their problems. Despite this, Ball writes that Third Way summarised its findings in a short report that ignored all the sentiments heard on the tour which challenged Third Way's ideology and instead selectively highlighted sentiments which adhered to Third Way's ideology:

As a result of Ball's report, the validity of Third Way's research has come into question. However, Third Way strongly disputed Ball's claim in a public post. Third Way's Matt Bennett wrote in response: "We are dismayed that in the story, Molly writes that we omitted information that is actually in the report we drafted about the WI visit. And she indicates that we have drawn conclusions that we do not reach and do not share". He also stated:
Yes, in the last page of the report, we provide some evidence that people believe they can still work together. But nowhere in the report do we even imply that means they think politicians should support a centrist policy agenda. ... Moreover, this research is, by its very nature, anecdotal. It is about impressions, which can vary widely, not quantitative data, which can be extrapolated. We make that very clear in the project description and in all the reports on our visits, each of which have been quite different from the rest.

See also 

 Centrism
 Democratic Leadership Council
 New Democrat Network
 New Labour
 Think tank
 Third Way

References

External links 
 

Non-profit organizations based in Washington, D.C.
Political and economic think tanks in the United States
Politics of the United States
Think tanks established in 2005